Gompholobium wonganense is a species of flowering plant in the family Fabaceae and is endemic to the Wongan Hills area of Western Australia. It is an erect, spreading shrub with simple leaves and uniformly yellow, pea-like flowers.

Description
Flowering occurs from September to November and the fruit is a cylindrical pod.

Taxonomy
Gompholobium wonganense was first formally described in 2008 by Jennifer Anne Chappill in Australian Systematic Botany from specimens collected near the Wongan Hills in 1983. The specific epithet (wonganense) means "native of Wongan Hills".

Distribution
This pea is found near Wongan Hills in the Avon Wheatbelt biogeographic region of south-western Western Australia.

Conservation status
Gompholobium wonganense is classified as "Priority Three" by the Government of Western Australia Department of Biodiversity, Conservation and Attractions, meaning that it is poorly known and known from only a few locations but is not under imminent threat.

References

wonganense
Eudicots of Western Australia
Plants described in 2008